Tionesta can refer to:

 Tionesta, California, an unincorporated town
 Tionesta, Pennsylvania, a borough
 Tionesta Township, Forest County, Pennsylvania